HMS Oxford Castle (K692) was a , of United Kingdom's Royal Navy. She was named after Oxford Castle in England.

She was built at Harland and Wolff in Northern Ireland and launched on 11 December 1943.  She survived the Second World War and was scrapped at Briton Ferry in September 1960.

References

Publications
 

 

Castle-class corvettes
Ships built in Belfast
1943 ships
Ships built by Harland and Wolff